Video Multimethod Assessment Fusion (VMAF) is an objective full-reference video quality metric developed by Netflix in cooperation with the University of Southern California, The IPI/LS2N lab Nantes Université,  and the Laboratory for Image and Video Engineering (LIVE) at The University of Texas at Austin. It predicts subjective video quality based on a reference and distorted video sequence. The metric can be used to evaluate the quality of different video codecs, encoders, encoding settings, or transmission variants.

History 
The metric is based on initial work from the group of Professor C.-C. Jay Kuo at the University of Southern California. Here, the applicability of fusion of different video quality metrics using support vector machines (SVM) has been investigated, leading to a "FVQA (Fusion-based Video Quality Assessment) Index" that has been shown to outperform existing image quality metrics on a subjective video quality database.

The method has been further developed in cooperation with Netflix, using different subjective video datasets, including a Netflix-owned dataset ("NFLX"). Subsequently renamed "Video Multimethod Assessment Fusion", it was announced on the Netflix TechBlog in June 2016 and version 0.3.1 of the reference implementation was made available under a permissive open-source license.

In 2017, the metric was updated to support a custom model that includes an adaptation for cellular phone screen viewing, generating higher quality scores for the same input material. In 2018, a model that predicts the quality of up to 4K resolution content was released. The datasets on which these models were trained have not been made available to the public.

In 2021, a Technology and Engineering Emmy Award was awarded to Beamr, Netflix, University of Southern California, University of Nantes, The University of Texas at Austin, SSIMWAVE, Disney, Google, Brightcove and ATEME for the Development of Open Perceptual Metrics for Video Encoding Optimization. It was the second time in 20 years that universities got an Emmy Award. It was also the first time a French University got one.

Components 
VMAF uses existing image quality metrics and other features to predict video quality:
 Visual Information Fidelity (VIF): considers information fidelity loss at four different spatial scales
 Detail Loss Metric (DLM): measures loss of details, and impairments which distract viewer attention
 Mean Co-Located Pixel Difference (MCPD): measures temporal difference between frames on the luminance component

The above features are fused using a SVM-based regression to provide a single output score in the range of 0–100 per video frame, with 100 being quality identical to the reference video. These scores are then temporally pooled over the entire video sequence using the arithmetic mean to provide an overall  differential mean opinion score (DMOS).

Due to the public availability of the training source code ("VMAF Development Kit", VDK), the fusion method can be re-trained and evaluated based on different video datasets and features.

Anti-noise signal-to-noise ratio (AN-SNR) was used in earlier versions of VMAF as a quality metric but was subsequently abandoned.

Performance 
An early version of VMAF has been shown to outperform other image and video quality metrics such as SSIM, PSNR-HVS and VQM-VFD on three of four datasets in terms of prediction accuracy, when compared to subjective ratings. Its performance has also been analyzed in another paper, which found that VMAF did not perform better than SSIM and MS-SSIM on a video dataset. In 2017, engineers from RealNetworks reported good reproducibility of Netflix' performance findings. In MSU video quality metrics benchmark, where its various versions (including VMAF NEG) were tested, VMAF outperformed all other metrics on all compression standards (H.265, VP9, AV1, VVC).

VMAF scores can be artificially increased without improving perceived quality by applying various operations before or after distorting the video, sometimes without impacting the popular PSNR metric.

Software 
A reference implementation written in C and Python ("VMAF Development Kit, VDK") is published as free software under the terms of BSD+Patent license. Its source code and additional material are available on GitHub.

See also 
 Perceptual Evaluation of Video Quality (PEVQ)
 VQuad-HD

References

External links
 Reference implementation

Film and video technology
Digital television
Image processing